Saint-Honoré is a commune in the Seine-Maritime department in the Normandy region in northern France.

Geography

Population

Places of interest
 The church of St. Honoré, dating from the eighteenth century.
 A sixteenth century sandstone cross.

See also
Communes of the Seine-Maritime department

References

Communes of Seine-Maritime